Kodi Andrew Justice (born April 3, 1995) is an American professional basketball player for Śląsk Wrocław of the Polish Basketball League. He played college basketball for the Arizona State Sun Devils.

Early life and high school career
Justice began playing basketball on the Amateur Athletic Union circuit in eighth grade. He was a varsity starter at Dobson High School in Mesa, Arizona since his freshman season. As a senior, Justice averaged 15.4 points, 6.8 rebounds and 5.5 assists per game.

College career
Justice played college basketball for Arizona State for four years. He missed the second half of his freshman season with a foot injury. Justice averaged 7.9 points, 2.4 assists, and 2.2 rebounds per game. As a junior, Justice averaged 9.2 points, 2.8 rebounds and 2.4 assists per game, shooting 41.7 percent from three-point range. He frequently had to play out of position at power forward due to the lack of size on the team. On November 23, 2017, Justice scored a career-high 28 points in a 92–90 win over Kansas State. He averaged 12.7 points per game as a senior and finished with over 1,000 career points.

Professional career
On July 24, 2018, Justice signed with Russian club Parma of the VTB United League. In 17 appearances, he averaged 10.6 points, 2.3 assists and 1.6 rebounds per game. On March 1, Justice signed with Zielona Góra of the Polish Basketball League and the VTB United League. On August 4, he signed with Pallacanestro Trieste of the Italian Lega Basket Serie A (LBA). Justice was named most valuable player of Round 11 of the LBA after recording 24 points, six rebounds and six assists in a 69–61 victory over Universo Treviso on December 1. He averaged 9.8 points per game in 19 appearances for Trieste. On November 7, 2020, Justice signed with KK Zadar of the HT Premijer liga and the ABA League. He averaged 10.9 points, 2.4 rebounds, and 2.1 assists per game. On September 5, 2021, Justice signed with Śląsk Wrocław of the Polish Basketball League.

Personal life
Justice has been diagnosed with dyslexia. He did not speak publicly about his struggles with dyslexia until his junior year in college.

References

External links
Arizona State Sun Devils bio

1995 births
Living people
American expatriate basketball people in Croatia
American expatriate basketball people in Italy
American expatriate basketball people in Poland
American expatriate basketball people in Russia
American men's basketball players
Arizona State Sun Devils men's basketball players
Basket Zielona Góra players
Basketball players from Arizona
KK Zadar players
Pallacanestro Trieste players
Parma Basket players
Sportspeople with dyslexia
Shooting guards
Śląsk Wrocław basketball players
Sportspeople from Mesa, Arizona